Giacinto Gaggia (8 October 1847 - 15 April 1933) was an Italian Roman Catholic prelate who served as the Bishop of Brescia from 1913 until his death. Ordained in Rome in 1870, he was consecrated to the episcopate in 1909 and made an archbishop in 1930. He ordained Giovanni Battista Montini (the future Pope Paul VI) to the priesthood in mid-1920.

Gaggia was born in the Brescia province to Emmanuele Giacomo Gaggia and Angela Boninsegna di Manerbio. He received the subdiaconate in Brescia on 19 December 1868 and was later elevated to the diaconate also in Brescia on 31 October 1869. He was ordained in Rome since his diocesan bishop was in Rome for the First Vatican Council that Pope Pius IX had convoked. He was consecrated to the episcopate in the Lateran Basilica in 1909.

Gaggia died in 1933.

References

External links
Catholic-Hierarchy.org

1847 births
1933 deaths
20th-century Italian Roman Catholic archbishops
Bishops appointed by Pope Pius X
Roman Catholic archbishops of Brescia